Masiung Banah is a Malaysian politician who has been the State Minister of Youth and Sports and also part of Parti Gagasan Rakyat Sabah (GAGASAN) member, the one of the Gabungan Rakyat Sabah (GRS) component parties. He has served as the Member of Sabah State Legislative Assembly (MLA) for Kuamut since March 2008.

Election results

Honours 
  :
  Commander of the Order of Kinabalu (PGDK) - Datuk (2014)

References

Malaysian politicians
Living people
Year of birth missing (living people)